Kantō Shrine (関東神宮, Kantō jingu) was a Shinto shrine in Lüshunkou District, Kwantung Leased Territory (today Lüshunkou District, Dalian, Liaoning, China). It was established on June 1, 1938, and closed in 1945 at the end of the Japanese occupation of China. It was formerly an imperial shrine of the first rank (官幣社, kanpeisha) in the Modern system of ranked Shinto Shrines. The kami enshrined here were Emperor Meiji and Amaterasu Omikami.

See also
List of Jingū

Japanese diaspora in China
Shinto in China
1938 establishments in the Japanese colonial empire
Jingū
History of Dalian
Religion in Liaoning
Shinto shrines in the Japanese colonial empire
Religious organizations established in 1938
Religious buildings and structures completed in 1938
Religious organizations disestablished in 1945
20th-century Shinto shrines

Kanpei-taisha